Persatuan Sepakbola Cilacap dan Sekitarnya (simply known as PSCS Cilacap) is an Indonesian football club based in Cilacap Regency, Central Java. They currently compete in the Liga 2. In 2018, the club was promoted to the Liga 2 after became the runner-up of 2018 Liga 3.

Honours
Liga Indonesia First Division
 Third-places (1): 2009-2010
Indonesia Soccer Championship B
 Champions (1): 2016
Liga 3 
 Runner Up (1): 2018

Players

Current squad

Coaching Staff

References

External links
Official Online News for PSCS Cilacap
PSCS Cilacap at facebook.com
PSCS Cilacap at liga-indonesia.co.id
 

 
Football clubs in Indonesia
1970 establishments in Indonesia
Association football clubs established in 1970
Football clubs in Central Java